Angrignon station is a Montreal Metro station in Le Sud-Ouest borough of Montreal, Quebec. It is operated by the Société de transport de Montréal (STM) and is the western terminus of the Green Line. The station includes a large bus terminus for buses to southwest Montreal, the West Island (Dorval), and South Western Quebec. It opened in 1978.

Architecture 

Angrignon station is built with windows encasing the tracks and side platforms, which creates a very light and airy environment.  Jean-Louis Beaulieu received an award from the Ordre des architectes du Québec for the design of the station.

The station is equipped with the MétroVision information screens which displays news, commercials, and the time till the next train.

Artwork 
On the platforms, Les Boîtes vivantes by Shelley Miller is a ceramic photography montage of Parc Angrignon's Quartiers d’hiver. This was the winter residence of animals of the Jardin des merveilles (Garden of Wonders) - a former urban zoo in Parc La Fontaine. The work was installed in 2022 as part of work to make the station accessible.

Origin of the name 
Jean-Baptiste Arthur Angrignon was alderman of the district of Saint-Paul and a member of the Executive Committee of the city of Montreal.  He oversaw the development of what is now Parc Angrignon on what was land that belonged to the Crawford family.  The area was named after him in 1927.

Nearby points of interest 
 Carrefour Angrignon shopping centre
 Parc Angrignon
 Ferme Angrignon zoo

Terminus Angrignon

This large bus terminal is a facility of the Réseau de transport métropolitain (RTM). One area has bus bays assigned to suburban commuter buses from southwestern Quebec, with three bus loops being used by the STM for routes that service southwest Montreal and the West Island. They also operate an adjoining park and ride lot.

Connecting bus routes

Station improvements 
In October 2019, work began to make the station universally accessible with the installation of elevators at a cost of $18m. As part of the project, the glass walls of the station were replaced to improve watertightness. A piece of artwork was also installed. The work was completed on December 9 2022, making it the 24th accessible station.

See also 
 ARTM park and ride lots

References

External links 

 Angrignon Station site
 Montreal by Metro, metrodemontreal.com - photos, information, and trivia
 Ordre des architectes du Québec

 RTM Page for bus services
 CIT Roussillon
 CIT du Sud Ouest
 CIT Haut Saint Laurent
 2011 STM System Map

Green Line (Montreal Metro)
Exo bus stations
Le Sud-Ouest
Railway stations in Canada opened in 1978